Mount Trafalgar is an extinct volcano on the north east coast of Oro Province, Papua New Guinea. The mountain is a major andesite volcano, with the magma known for its high levels of Nickel and Chromium. Captain John Moresby named the mountain after the naval battle of Trafalgar.

Hydrographers Range, Mount Lamington, and Mount Victory are three other large Quaternary stratovolcanoes in south-eastern New Guinea.

External links
 

Oro Province
Trafalgar
Trafalgar
Pleistocene stratovolcanoes